Minangkabau International Airport Station (BIM) is a class I airport railway station located on airport complex in Katapiang, Batang Anai, Padang Pariaman Regency. The position of this station is to the northeast of the airport's passenger terminal. The station, which is located at an altitude of +2 meters, is included in the Regional Division II West Sumatra.

This station was completed in 2016–2017 and only started operating with the inauguration of the Minangkabau Airport Rail Link by President of Indonesia Joko Widodo on 21 May 2018.

The station is the third airport railway station in Indonesia, after  station and Kualanamu station.

Services
The following is a list of train services at the Minangkabau International Airport Station.

Passenger services
Economy commuter
Lembah Anai railbus, to 
Airport rail link
Minangkabau Airport Rail Link, to

References

External links
 

padang Pariaman Regency
railway stations in West Sumatra
railway stations opened in 2018
Airport railway stations in Indonesia
2018 establishments in Indonesia